Carlstad Crusaders is a Swedish American football team, based in Karlstad, Sweden. The team plays at Tingvalla IP in Karlstad.

History
The club was founded in 1991. It played its first game in 1992 against the Uddevalla Ravens.

Championships

Sweden Superserien
Sweden Superserien championships
The Crusaders are eight-time Swedish champions having won the championship in 2010, 2011, 2012, 2013, 2014, 2015, 2016, 2017, and 2020.

Sweden Superserien finals appearances
The team has been to eighteen national finals in 2002, 2003, 2004, 2005, 2006, 2007, 2009, 2010, 2011, 2012, 2013, 2014, 2015, 2016, 2017, 2018, 2019, and 2020.

EFAF Cup
The Crusaders won the EFAF Cup in 2003.

IFAF Europe Champions League
The Crusaders were IFAF Europe Champions League champions in 2015.

References

External links
Official website

American football teams in Sweden
Sport in Karlstad
American football teams established in 1991
1991 establishments in Sweden